The Audi Shooting Brake was a concept car developed by Audi and officially unveiled at the 2005 Tokyo Motor Show. It was a study of a sporty two-door compact shooting brake hatchback.

The concept vehicle was based on the second-generation Audi TT and provided, to some extent, a preview of the new TT, which was yet to be launched. The vehicle also had Audi's quattro four wheel drive system.

The exterior appearance was dominated by a massive single frame front grille, characteristic to the newest Audi models, as well as clear-glass headlights with new LED technology and 19-inch double-spoke wheels from quattro GmbH. The interior put the emphasis on sporty design and is dominated by materials like aluminium and leather. A notable interior feature was an evolutionary version of navigation system with touch screen monitor and character recognition.

In 2007, an Audi executive said that the car would not be produced.

References

External links

Audi concept vehicles
Hatchbacks